C. Henry Gordon (born Henry Racke; June 17, 1883 – December 3, 1940) was an American stage and film actor.

Gordon was born in New York City, New York. He was educated both in New York and abroad in Switzerland and Germany. For some years he owned and ran a silver mine in New Mexico. After failing to succeed in this venture, he became an actor. 

Gordon's entry into acting came accidentally when he accompanied his sister to a tryout for a play. The director had him read a part and he soon was a member of the troupe. He had a long stage career, on and off Broadway, before entering films. His Broadway credits included The Shanghai Gesture (1928), The Shanghai Gesture (1926), Mismates (1925), Puppets (1925), The Saint (1924), Mr. Pitt (1924), The Crooked Square (1923), Thin Ice (1922), Lights Out (1922), and The Drums of Jeopardy (1922).

He first worked in films in 1911 with George Beban in New York. He appeared in more than 70 films between 1930 and 1940, frequently as a villain. He often portrayed people of color, such as Surat Khan in The Charge of the Light Brigade (1936, opposite Errol Flynn), the Chinese smuggler Sam Kee in Lazy River (1934), and the Sultan of Padaya in Sophie Lang Goes West (1937).

On December 3, 1940, Gordon died at Hollywood Hospital in Los Angeles, California, after having his leg amputated the previous day because of a blood clot.

Filmography

 A Devil with Women (1930) as Minor Role (uncredited)
 Renegades (1930) as Captain Mordiconi
 Once a Sinner (1931) as Serge Ratoff
 Charlie Chan Carries On (1931) as John Ross
 The Black Camel (1931) as Huntley Van Horn (uncredited)
 Hush Money (1931) as Jack Curtis
 A Woman of Experience (1931) as Captain Muller
 Young as You Feel (1931) as Harry Lamson
 Honor of the Family (1931) as Renard
 Mata Hari (1932) as Dubois
 The Gay Caballero (1932) as Don Paco Morales
 Scarface (1932) as Police Inspector Ben Guarino
 Doomed Battalion (1932) as Italian General
 State's Attorney (1932) as Attorney Grey
 The Strange Love of Molly Louvain (1932) as Detective Martin
 Roar of the Dragon (1932) as Voronsky
 The Washington Masquerade (1932) as Hinsdale
 Miss Pinkerton (1932) as Dr. Stuart
 Thirteen Women (1932) as Swami Yogadachi
 Hell's Highway (1932) as "Blacksnake" Skinner
 The Crooked Circle (1932) as Yoganda
 Kongo (1932) as Gregg Whitehall
 Rasputin and the Empress (1932) as Grand Duke Igor
 Whistling in the Dark (1933) as Lombardo
 The Secret of Madame Blanche (1933) as State's Attorney
 Clear All Wires! (1933) as Commissar
 Gabriel Over the White House (1933) as Nick Diamond
 Made on Broadway (1933) as Mayor Tom Starling
 Storm at Daybreak (1933) as Panto Nikitch
 The Devil's in Love (1933) as Capt. Radak, Chief of Police
 Turn Back the Clock (1933) as Dave Holmes
 Penthouse (1933) as Jim Crelliman
 Stage Mother (1933) as Ricco
 Night Flight (1933) as Daudet
 Broadway Thru a Keyhole (1933) as Tim Crowley
 The Chief (1933) as Paul Clayton
 Advice to the Forlorn (1933) as Kane
 The Women in His Life (1934) as Tony Perez
 Fugitive Lovers (1934) as Detective Daly
 This Side of Heaven (1934) as William Barnes
 Lazy River (1934) as Sam Kee
 Men in White (1934) as Dr. Cunningham
 Stamboul Quest (1934) as Ali Bey
 Straight Is the Way (1934) as Sullivan
 Hide-Out (1934) as Tony Berrelli aka The Boss
 Death on the Diamond (1934) as Joe Karnes
 The Great Hotel Murder (1935) as Dr. John M. Temple
 Pursuit (1935) as Nick Shawn
 The Crusades (1935) as Philip the Second - King of France
 Hollywood Extra Girl (1935, Short, Documentary) as Crusades Actor (uncredited)
 The Big Broadcast of 1936 (1935) as Gordoni
 Professional Soldier (1935) as Gino
 Under Two Flags (1936) as Lt. Petaine
 Hollywood Boulevard (1936) as Jordan Winslow
 The Big Game (1936) as Brad Anthony
 The Charge of the Light Brigade (1936) as Surat Khan
 Love Letters of a Star (1936) as Lt. Valcour
 Trouble in Morocco (1937) as Captain Nardant
 Charlie Chan at the Olympics (1937) as Arthur Hughes
 Trapped by G-Men (1937) as Kilgour
 Sophie Lang Goes West (1937) as Sultan of Padaya
 Conquest (1937) as Prince Poniatowski
 Stand-In (1937) as Nassau
 Tarzan's Revenge (1938) as Ben Alleu Bey
 The Black Doll (1938) as Nelson Rood
 Invisible Enemy (1938) as Nikolai Kamarov
 Yellow Jack (1938) as Col. Wiggins, Medical Corp (uncredited)
 Adventure in Sahara (1938) as Capt. Savatt
 Sharpshooters (1938) as Kolter
 Long Shot (1939) as Lew Ralston
 The Return of the Cisco Kid (1939) as Mexican Captain
 Man of Conquest (1939) as Santa Ana
 Trapped in the Sky (1939) as Fornay
 Heritage of the Desert (1939) as Henry Holderness
 Charlie Chan in City in Darkness (1939) as Prefect of Police J. Romaine
 Passport to Alcatraz (1940) as Leon Fenten
 Women in Hiding (1940, Short) as Dr. Mansby, Clinic Administrator
 Kit Carson (1940) as General Castro
 Charlie Chan at the Wax Museum (1940) as Dr. Cream
 You, the People (1940, Short) as Boss Bailey

Notes

References

External links

1883 births
1940 deaths
American male film actors
Male actors from New York City
American amputees
American male stage actors
20th-century American male actors
American expatriates in Switzerland
American expatriates in Germany